Murder at Midnight was an old-time radio show featuring macabre tales of suspense, often with a supernatural twist. It was produced in New York and was syndicated beginning in 1946. The show's writers included Robert Newman, Joseph Ruscoll, Max Ehrlich, and William Norwood, and it was directed by Anton M. Leder. The host was Raymond Morgan, who delivered the memorable lines of introduction over Charles Paul's effective organ theme: "Midnight, the witching hour when the night is darkest, our fears the strongest, and our strength at its lowest ebb. Midnight, when the graves gape open and death strikes."

A total of 50 episodes were produced. Ten shows were syndicated and rerun on Mutual in 1950.

References

External links
 Murder At Midnight at archive.org
 Copyright registration for Murder at Midnight showing 50 episodes

American radio dramas
1940s American radio programs